"My Secret Friend" is a song performed by IAMX and Imogen Heap, released as the third single from the album Kingdom of Welcome Addiction. The CD single is available only through the IAMX webstore.

Music video
The music video, directed by Chris Corner, features Corner dressed as a woman, the video's lead female character, and Heap as a man, the lead male character.  He stated in an interview that when he wrote it he pictured the characters as siblings, who have a romantic, possibly incestuous, relationship. The video is featured on the CD single.

Track listing

Song versions
Album version – 4:06
Radio edit – 3:45
Omega Man remix – 4:45, remixed and additionally produced by Joe Wilson.
The Unfall Broken Waltz rework – 4:41, remixed by Corner under the alias Unfall, this version doesn't include Heap's vocals.
"Mein geheimer Freund" – 4:00, solo acoustic piano version in German released at IAMX's official YouTube channel announcing his Germany tour.
Interpretation by Larry Driscoll – 3:27, cover version included on Dogmatic Infidel Comedown OK as a hidden song in a 4-song track.

Chart positions

References

Imogen Heap songs
2009 singles
Songs written by Imogen Heap
IAMX songs
Songs written by Chris Corner
2009 songs